Vassiliki "Viky" Arvaniti (also transliterated Vasiliki; born March 17, 1985, in Athens, Greece) is a beach volleyball player from Greece, who won the gold medal at the 2005 European Championships in Moscow, Russia and the 2007 European Championship in Valencia, Spain, partnering Vasso Karadassiou. She represented her native country at the 2004 Summer Olympics in her home town, with Thaleia Koutroumanidou. At the 2008 Summer Olympics, she competed with Karadassiou. She took part in the 2012 London Olympics with Maria Tsiartsiani, who was later injured. Since 2013, her teammate has been Peny Karagkouni, who used to play indoor volleyball.

References

External links
 
 
 

1985 births
Living people
Greek beach volleyball players
Beach volleyball players at the 2004 Summer Olympics
Beach volleyball players at the 2008 Summer Olympics
Beach volleyball players at the 2012 Summer Olympics
Olympic beach volleyball players of Greece
Sportspeople from Athens
Greek women's volleyball players
Women's beach volleyball players
21st-century Greek women